The Government of India established the Secondary Education Commission on 23 September 1952 under the chairmanship of Dr. Lakshmanaswamy Mudaliar. It was called the Mudaliar Commission after him. The commission recommended diversifying the curriculum, adding an intermediate level, introducing three-tier undergraduate courses, etc.

Introduction 
The Central Advisory Board of Education suggested to the Government of India that there was a need for complete formation of secondary education. This commission is also called Mudaliar Education Commission after the name of

Policy for the Spread of Secondary Education 
 Secondary education should be made vocational so that 30% of the students at the lower secondary level and 50% of the students at the higher secondary level can get vocational education
 Equality of opportunities in secondary education should be emphasized, for this, arrangements should be made to provide more and more scholarships at this level.
 Special programs should be organized for the expansion of secondary education among girls, scheduled castes and tribes.
 Genuine efforts should be made for the development of talent
 Plans should be made for the expansion of secondary education in each district and they should be fully implemented within a period of 10 years.
 All the new schools should complete the required education program and the standard of the existing schools should be made high.

References 

Secondary education in India
High school course levels
School accreditors
Ministry of Education (India)